Coming Home For Christmas is a 2013 Canadian Christmas television film written by Kyle McGlohon and Bruce Spiegelman and directed by Vanessa Parise. It stars Ben Hollingsworth, Amy Jo Johnson, Carly McKillip and Britt McKillip.

Plot
When their parents are separating, two sisters reunite all family to celebrate Christmas together for the first time in a long time.

Cast
 Ben Hollingsworth as Mike
 Amy Jo Johnson as Wendy
 Carly McKillip as Kate
 Britt McKillip as Melanie
 George Canyon as Al
 Jordan McIntosh as Ryan

References

External links

 
 Vanessa Parise official website.com

2013 television films
2013 films
Canadian television films
Canadian Christmas films
English-language Canadian films
Films set in 2013
2010s English-language films
Films directed by Vanessa Parise
2010s Canadian films